Arhopala dodonaea, the pale Himalayan oakblue, (sometimes listed as a synonym of Amblypodia rama) is a small butterfly found in India that belongs to the lycaenids or blues family.

Range
The butterfly occurs in India (Kumaon) and Pakistan. Afghanistan, Northwest Himalaya - Sikkim, Chitral.

Status
William Harry Evans reported that the species was common in 1932.

See also
List of butterflies of India (Lycaenidae)

Cited references

References
 
 
 

dodonaea
Butterflies of Asia
Lepidoptera of Nepal
Fauna of the Himalayas
Butterflies described in 1857
Taxa named by Frederic Moore